Temascaltepec is a municipality located in the Ixtapan Region of the State of Mexico in Mexico. Temascaltepec has an area of 547.5 km2. It borders the municipalities of Valle de Bravo, Amanalco de Becerra, Tejupilco, San Simón de Guerrero, Texcaltitlán, Zinacantepec, Coatepec Harinas, and Zacazonapan. Temascaltepec's population was 26,968 in 1990, but rose to 30,336 by 2005, according to INEGI.

Geography

The Mountain of Temascaltepec is a prolongation of Nevado de Toluca and crosses the municipality. The most significant elevations are the hills of Temeroso, Soledad, Fortin, Peñas del Diablo, Peñon, Tres Reyes and Juan Luis. The three main rivers of Temascaltepec are Verde or De la Presa, Vado, and Temascaltepec. All three rivers experience water flow year-round. In addition, there are 41 freshwater springs. The municipality is warm and subtropical in the north and east, and semi-arid in the south and west.

Flora and fauna
The area hosts a diverse array of flora and fauna. Plant life include: ash trees (Fraxinus spp.), pine (Pinus spp.), oyamel (Abies religiosa), holm oak (Quercus ilex), cedar, sabino, guaje (Leucaena esculenta),
tepegauje (Lysiloma acapulcense), madroño (Arbutus xalapensis), mahogany (Swietenia spp.), Jacaranda spp., capulín (Prunus salicifolia), guavas (Psidium spp.), such as arrayán (P. sartorianum), mangos (Mangifera spp.), copal (Copaifera spp.) and peanut (Arachis hypogaea).

Animal life include cats, deer, collared peccary (Pecari tajacu), squirrels, cuinique (Notocitellus adocetus), long-tailed weasel (Mustela frenata), hares, nine-banded armadillo, tejón (Nasua narica), tigrillo, bats, pocket gophers, skunks, cacomiztle (Bassariscus astutus), gray fox (Urocyon cinereoargenteus), sparrowhawks (Accipiter spp.), eagles, vulture, common raven (Corvus corax), quebrantahueso (Caracara cheriway), owls, magpie-jays (Calocitta spp.), chachalaca, quail, huilota (Zenaida macroura), corn birds, turtledove, bobo, multo birds, chichicuilote (possibly Charadrius wilsonia), tortoises, cincuantes, scorpions, alicante, toads, lizards, frogs and axolotls (Ambystoma mexicanum).

The principal natural resources, aside from minerals, are the forests, being present on 68% of the territory. The remaining territory is distributed amongst agricultural use, urban zones, breeding grounds, ways and water-bearing areas.

Politics

Demographics

References